After the Lights Go Down Low is an album by vocalist Al Hibbler, released by the Atlantic label in 1957. The album contains tracks that were recorded between 1950 and 1956, with several being released on the Original and Atlantic labels as singles.

Reception

AllMusic's Arwulf stated that "anyone else putting on such a show would run the risk of sounding foolish, Hibbler had so much class mingled with chutzpah that each performance feels like something from an impossible or imaginary jazz/lieder recital."

Track listing 
 "After the Lights Go Down Low" (Leroy Lovett, Allen White) – 3:14
 "You Will Be Mine" (Al Sears) – 3:14
 "Dedicated to You" (Lovett, White) – 2:41
 "Song of the Wanderer" (Neil Moret) – 2:23
 "Tell Me" (Lovett) – 3:00
 "Trav'lin' Light" (Jimmy Mundy, Trummy Young, Johnny Mercer) – 2:30
 "Autumn Winds" (S. Gerwitz) – 3:16
 "This Is Always" (Harry Warren, Mack Gordon) – 2:54
 "Now I Lay Me Down to Dream" (Eddy Howard, Ted Fio Rito) – 3:15
 "If I Knew You Were There" (Joe Bushkin, Milton Berle, Buddy Arnold) – 3:06
 "I Won't Tell a Soul I Love You" (Hughie Clark, Ross Parker) – 3:12 
 "The Blues Came Falling Down" (Traditional) – 2:46
 "Danny Boy" (Traditional) – 2:29 Bonus track on CD reissue 
 "Old Folks" (Dedette Lee Hill, Willard Robison) – 3:02 Bonus track on CD reissue 
Recorded in New York City on April 19, 1950 (tracks 3, 4, 10 & 13), October 25, 1950 (tracks 6, 12 & 14), June 27, 1951 (tracks 8, 9 & 11) and late 1954 (tracks 1, 2, 5 & 7)

Personnel 
Al Hibbler – vocals with
Billy Kyle and His Orchestra (tracks 3, 4, 10 & 13)
Billy Taylor and His Orchestra (tracks 6, 12 & 14)
Jimmy Mundy and His Orchestra (tracks 8, 9 & 11)
Leroy Lovett and His Orchestra featuring Sam Taylor, Al Sears and Mickey Baker (tracks 1, 2, 5 & 7)

References 

Al Hibbler albums
1957 albums
Atlantic Records albums
Albums arranged by Jimmy Mundy